The 2010 NCAA Women's Gymnastics Championship was held in Gainesville, FL on April 22–24, 2010. UCLA Bruins won the 2010 team competition, earning their sixth national championship. LSU's Susan Jackson scored 39.625 points to capture the individual title.

NCAA Women's Gymnastics Regional Fields:
Los Angeles Regional (at UCLA): UCLA (First), Arkansas (Second), Iowa State, Arizona, BYU, Arizona State, Saturday, April 10 6 pm (PT)
Salt Lake City Regional (at Utah): Florida (First), Utah (Second), Auburn, Boise State, Denver, Washington
Columbia Regional (at Missouri): Missouri (First), Oregon State (Second), Georgia (Second),  Minnesota, Iowa, North Carolina (Note: Oregon State won tiebreaker)
Lexington Regional (at Kentucky): Alabama (First), Nebraska (Second), Illinois, Kentucky, Central Michigan, Michigan State
University Park Regional (at Penn State): Oklahoma (First), LSU (Second), Penn State, Maryland, Ohio State, New Hampshire
Morgantown Regional (at West Virginia): Stanford (First), Michigan (Second), Southern Utah, North Carolina State, Kent State, West Virginia
NCAA Women's Gymnastics Championship:
NCAA Championships, Gainesville, FL, April 22, Afternoon Session (1 p.m. ET): UCLA (No.1 seed),  Oklahoma (No. 4), Utah (No. 5), Oregon State (No. 8), LSU (No. 9), Nebraska (No. 12); Evening Session (7 p.m. ET): Florida (No. 2), Alabama (No. 3), Stanford (No. 6), Arkansas (No. 7), Missouri (No. 10), Michigan (No. 11)
 NCAA Championship (Super Six Finals), Gainesville, FL, April 23 ( 6 p.m. ET): UCLA, Utah, Oklahoma, Alabama, Florida, Stanford
 Individual Event Finals – Gainesville, FL, Saturday, April 24 (6 p.m.)

Champions

Team Results

Session 1

Session 2

Super Six

References

External links
 NCAA Gymnastics Championship Official site

NCAA Women's Gymnastics championship
2010 in American sports
NCAA Women's Gymnastics Championship
April 2010 sports events in the United States
2010 in Florida